Dragnificent! is a television series on the American network TLC. The show started as a special branded as Drag Me Down the Aisle which aired on March 9, 2019. It features Alexis Michelle, BeBe Zahara Benet, Jujubee, and Thorgy Thor, four drag queens who are all RuPaul's Drag Race alumnae, helping an engaged woman to plan her upcoming wedding. On January 15, 2020, TLC announced that it had given a full season run to Dragnificent!, a new show to be based on the Drag Me Down the Aisle special. The series premiered on April 19, 2020.

Premise
The series follows the Dragnificent team as they transform women into their best, most beautiful and confident selves for the big days of their lives.

Cast
 Alexis Michelle, make up and body image
 BeBe Zahara Benet, event planner
 Jujubee, fashion
 Thorgy Thor, music and entertainment

Episodes

Special (2019)

Season 1 (2020)

Awards and nominations

References

External links
 
 

2010s LGBT-related reality television series
2019 American television series debuts
2020s LGBT-related reality television series
American LGBT-related reality television series
Drag (clothing) television shows
TLC (TV network) original programming